Salkhad is a Syrian city in the As-Suwayda Governorate, southern Syria.
It is the capital of Salkhad District, one of  the governorate's three districts. It has a population of 15,000 inhabitants.

It is located at 1350 metres above sea level in the central Jabal el Druze highlands.

History

The city is mentioned four times in the Hebrew Bible as "Salcah", a settlement in biblical Bashan. During the second century BC Salcah was a flourishing Nabataean city, where the gods Dushara and Allat were worshiped. Afterwards it was incorporated into the Roman province of Arabia, it was one of the important cities in Hauran during Roman and later Byzantine epochs, Salkhad is indicated in the Madaba mosaic map of the sixth century AD.

Due to the strategic position of the city overlooking Hauran plains to the west, the Ayyubid dynasty built a fortress in Salkhad between 1214–1247 to counter a possible attack of the Crusades into inner Hauran. It has also been said that Al-Afdal was exiled here by his uncle and brother.

The importance of the city decreased after the Crusades, and it was occasionally overrun by Bedouins seeking pasture in the summer for their flocks.

Ottoman era
In 1596, Salkhad appeared in the Ottoman tax registers  as Salhad (Sarhad) and was part of the nahiya of Bani Malik as-Sadir in the Hauran Sanjak. It had a Muslim population consisting of 55 households and 25 bachelors, and a Christian population of 50 households and 20 bachelors. The residents paid a fixed tax-rate of 40% on wheat, barley, summer crops, goats and beehives; a total of 36,500  akçe.

In 1838 Eli Smith noted that the place in ruins.

A number of Greek orthodox Christians, of Ghassanid ancestry, successively remained in the region. The town itself was abandoned in the late 18th century, but was repopulated by Druze and Greek Orthodox Christian families from Mount Lebanon beginning in 1858.

During Ottoman times, the city enjoyed a feudal-type autonomy like much of the Jabal el Druze area under the chieftaincy of Al-Hamdan family and later Al-Atrash family, many battles against Ottoman Turks took place in this region by the locals to maintain their autonomy.

Modern era
In the early 20th century, the city was part of the 1921–1936 Druze state under the French Mandate of Syria, the state was gradually incorporated into Syria after the Syrian Revolution of 1925–1927 led by Sultan Al-Atrash.

The city now is the centre of Salkhad district of As-Suwayda Governorate, it is the southernmost district in Syria.

Climate
Salkhad has a cold semi-arid climate (Köppen climate classification: BSk). In winter there is more rainfall than in summer. About  of precipitation falls annually.

Archaeology
The fortress of Salkhad is the most important monument located in a hill inside the city, built between 1214 and 1247 by the Ayyubid dynasty as a part of their defences against the crusades. It is said that this fortress were built in the site of older Roman fortifications. A hexagonal basalt minaret still standing intact in the city's main square. Many Roman old time houses, still partially inhabited by locals. Nabatean, Roman and Ayyubid tombs are also there with decorative motifs.

References

Bibliography

External links 
 Old image of the Fortress of Salkhad
Map of the town, Google Maps

Cities in Syria
Hebrew Bible cities
Populated places in Salkhad District
Archaeological sites in as-Suwayda Governorate
Druze communities in Syria
Eastern Orthodox Christian communities in Syria